Yelagin Island is a park island at the mouth of the Neva River which is part of St. Petersburg, Russia. Yelagin Island is home to the Yelagin Palace but has a few other buildings as well. A former suburban estate of 18 century Russian nobles and later of a dowager Empress Maria, widow of Paul I of Russia, it has been serving since after the revolutions of 1917 as a city public park, officially Central Park of Culture and Rest named after Sergey Kirov, the famous Bolshevik city leader of early 1930s who supervised development of the city.

Geography
It is a flat island located in the delta of the Neva River, between the Grand Nevka branch and the Central Nevka. The island has a surface of 94 hectares. It stretches from east to west for 2.1 km and has a maximum width from north to south of 0.8 km.

History
The island initially served as a wooded retreat for the ruling class. Originally known as Melgunov Island, the island takes its present name from its former owner, Ivan Yelagin (1725–93), best known as a founding father of the Russian Freemasonry. The palace was built in 1786 in the eastern section of the island.

In 1817, the island was bought for 350,000 rubles by the Imperial Cabinet on behalf of the Russian Monarchy. The following year the palace grounds underwent a thorough redesigning and restructuring led by architect Carlo Rossi. The works lasted four years and included a vast English landscape garden with a system of canals, bridges and ponds, as well as grottoes and gazebos.

Formerly off-limits for most local people, after the Russian Revolution, the isle was opened to the public as an urban park which still bears the name of Sergei Kirov.

Current use
In present times Yelagin Island is a popular weekend destination for Petersburgers. Visitors can rent boats to navigate the island's several ponds and canals. There are also rollerblade and bicycle rentals, as well as several attractions for children including pony rides, miniature trains and playgrounds. The island also features several kilometers of paved pathways.

See also
 Kamenny Islands

References

External links 
 

Islands of Saint Petersburg
River islands of Russia
Cultural heritage monuments of federal significance in Saint Petersburg